is a former Japanese football player.

Playing career
Hagino was born in Hokkaido on January 20, 1973. After graduating from Sapporo University, he joined Sanfrecce Hiroshima in 1995. On April 22, he debuted against Urawa Reds. However he could only play this match until 1996 and he retired end of 1996 season.

Club statistics

References

External links

1973 births
Living people
Sapporo University alumni
Association football people from Hokkaido
Japanese footballers
J1 League players
Sanfrecce Hiroshima players
Association football midfielders